Margrave Rudolf II of Hachberg-Sausenberg (medieval: Rudolf II of Hachberg-Susenberg) (1301–1352) was the son of Margrave Rudolf I of Hachberg-Sausenberg and his wife Agnes, the heiress of Otto of Rötteln.  After their elder brother Henry died in 1318, Rudolf II and his younger brother Otto I took up government in Rötteln and Sausenberg.  They moved their seat of government from Sausenburg Castle to Rötteln Castle.  In the fall of 1332, troops from the City of Basel besieged Rötteln Castle, because one of the brothers had stabbed the mayor of Basel.  The conflict was settled after mediation by the nobility of the city and the margraviate.

Marriage and issue 
Rudolf II was married to Catherine, the daughter of Ulrich of Thierstein.  Two children are documented:
 Rudolf III (1343–1428), his successor
 Agnes (d. around 1405), married Baron Burkhard II of Buchegg (d. after 10 June 1365)

See also 
 Margraviate of Baden
 Baden
 List of rulers of Baden

References 
 Fritz Schülin: Rötteln-Haagen, Beiträge zur Orts-, Landschafts- und Siedlungsgeschichte, Lörrach, 1965, p. 65
 Karl Seith: Die Burg Rötteln im Wandel ihrer Herrengeschlechter, Ein Beitrag zur Geschichte und Baugeschichte der Burg, Röttelbund e.V., Haagen, undated, p. 6, according to Schülin in: Das Markgräflerland, vol. 3, issue 1, 1931
 Gerhard Möhring: Chronologie zu Markgraf Rudolf III. von Hachberg, Herr zu Sausenberg und Rötteln (1343-1428), in: Das Markgräflerland, vol. 1, p. 53-63, Schopfheim, 2001
 Johann Christian Sachs: Einleitung in die Geschichte der Marggravschaft und des marggrävlichen altfürstlichen Hauses Baden, Frankfurt and Leipzig, 1764, part 1, p. 488-494,

External links

Footnotes 

Margraves of Baden-Hachberg
1301 births
1352 deaths
14th-century German nobility